Junaki (also Romanized as Jūnakī; also known as Dūnākī, Ḩānekī, and Jānakī) is a village in Ramjerd-e Do Rural District, Dorudzan District, Marvdasht County, Fars Province, Iran. At the 2006 census, its population was 542, in 126 families.

References 

Populated places in Marvdasht County